A spear is a pole weapon used for hunting and combat.

Spear may also refer to:

Arts, entertainment, and media
Spear (comics), a Marvel Comics supervillain
Spear (film), a 2015 Australian film
Spear (Pokémon), the Japanese name for Beedrill, a Pokémon character
The Spear (novel), a 1978 novel by James Herbert
The Spear (painting), a 2010 painting by Brett Murray
Spear's, a wealth management magazine

Military
Operation Spear (2005), US military action in Iraq
SAS Spear, the first submarine of the South African Navy
SPEAR 3, a European air-to-ground missile
Spears, slang for nuclear weapons

People with the name
Spear (surname)
Spear Lancaster, 2002 candidate for Governor of Maryland

Sports
Spear (wrestling), a professional wrestling attack
Spear tackle, head-first thrust into the ground

Other uses
Spear (liturgy), used in the Byzantine-Rite Churches
Cape Spear, in Newfoundland, Canada
Asparagus spear, a stalk of asparagus
Singapore Prisons Emergency Action Response, a department within the Singapore Prison Service
Spear Lúin, Irish mythological treasure
 Spear side, the male line of a family
 SPEAR_System or S.P.E.A.R., a self-defense system based on physics and physiology
Stanford Positron Electron Asymmetric Ring, an electron-positron collider now part of the Stanford Synchrotron Radiation Lightsource facility

See also
Justice Spear (disambiguation)
Speare, a surname
Spearing (disambiguation)
Spears (disambiguation)